Koen Bosma (born 11 September 1990 in Amstelveen, Netherlands) is a Dutch footballer who presently plays for Amsterdamsche FC of the Dutch Tweede Divisie as of 2015. Besides Netherlands, he has played in Cambodia, Vietnam, and Australia.

Career

Cambodia

Impressing during a trial with 2011 Cambodian League winners Phnom Penh Crown and netting three goals in a friendly versus TriAsia, Bosma officially completed his transfer to the club in August 2014, signing for one season only and intermingling with five foreigners as well as eight Cambodia national team players. Next, he participated in the pre-season 2014 Mekong Club Championship with the club, scoring a goal in their first game, a 5-2 defeat to Becamex Binh Duong in the semi-finals.

Comparing footballers in Cambodia to their Dutch counterparts, Bosma has stated that they are better at attacking play but are behind in terms of tactics and defense.

Vietnam

Cancelling his contract with the acquiescence of the Phnom Penh Crown board shortly after the Mekong Club Championship, the Dutchman signed for Song Lam Nghe An of the Vietnamese V.League 1 in December 2014, changing to a midfield position in the process. Despite beginning the 2015 season well with two starts and two assists in his first two games, Bosma was substituted on in the third round, which would prove to be his last official game in Vietnam. After only being used for practice matches, Bosma arranged a meeting with the Song Lam Nghe An president and left by April 2015.

Throughout his stay in Vietnam, the forward was seen as more of a playmaker and was praised by the club president as a smart footballer.

Australia

Joining Sydney United 58 of the Australian NPL NSW until the end of the 2015 season following his spell in Vietnam, Bosma almost sealed a move to a Malaysian third division team but the deal never happened. While plying his trade with Sydney United, the Amstelveen native helped them clinch the 2015 Waratah Cup, making two assists in the semi-final.

References

External links 
 Koen Bosma voelt zich gelukkig bij AFC na turbulent jaar
 at Soccerway

1990 births
Living people
Dutch footballers
Amsterdamsche FC players
Association football forwards
Association football midfielders
Dutch expatriate footballers
Dutch expatriate sportspeople in Australia
Eerste Divisie players
Expatriate footballers in Cambodia
Expatriate footballers in Vietnam
Expatriate soccer players in Australia
HFC Haarlem players
Sportspeople from Amstelveen
Phnom Penh Crown FC players
Song Lam Nghe An FC players
Sydney United 58 FC players
Tweede Divisie players
V.League 1 players
Footballers from North Holland
VVSB players
21st-century Dutch people